Luis Antonio Amuchástegui (born 12 December 1960 in Córdoba) is a former Argentine footballer. He played for a number of clubs in Argentina and represented the Argentina national football team. he played over 200 games for Racing de Córdoba.

Amuchástegui started his career with Racing de Córdoba, he was an important member of the team that contested the final of the Nacional championship in 1980. In 1983, he travelled to Spain to join Valencia CF for a fee of US$300,000 but he could not acclimatise to life in Europe and returned to Argentina without signing the contract, Valencia eventually signed Juan Jose Urruti instead, and Amuchástegui spent several months without a club before joining San Lorenzo de Almagro in 1984.

After a successful season with San Lorenzo he joined River Plate where he was part of the championship winning team of 1985-1986. He then helped the club to win the Copa Libertadores in 1986.

Amuchástegui moved to Mexico in 1986 and played for América. After a few years in Mexico he returned to Argentina to play for Racing de Córdoba and then General Paz Juniors in the lower leagues. In 1992, he joined San Lorenzo for pre-season training but walked out of the club without playing a single game for them. This incident marked his retirement from professional football.

Titles

External links
 Futbol Ochentoso article
 En Una Baldosa article
 Clarín article about the failed move to Spain

1960 births
Living people
Footballers from Córdoba, Argentina
Argentine people of Basque descent
Argentine footballers
Argentina international footballers
Association football forwards
Racing de Córdoba footballers
Valencia CF players
San Lorenzo de Almagro footballers
Club Atlético River Plate footballers
Club América footballers
Argentine Primera División players
Liga MX players
Argentine expatriate footballers
Expatriate footballers in Mexico